Cain's Ballroom is a historic music venue in Tulsa, Oklahoma that was built in 1924 as a garage for W. Tate Brady's automobiles. Madison W. "Daddy" Cain purchased the building in 1930 and named it Cain's Dance Academy.

In 2021, Pollstar ranked Cain's Ballroom at number 13 worldwide for ticket sales at club venues.

The venue played a prominent role in the development of western swing in the 1930s and 1940s, when Bob Wills and the Texas Playboys broadcast a near-daily show and performed live weekly.  

Leon Russell and his band were regularly booked at Cain's when it was owned by Larry Shaeffer.

It is also notable as one of only seven venues played by the Sex Pistols in 1978 during their only North American tour. The band appeared 11 January 1978. After the show, a frustrated Sid Vicious punched a hole in the drywall of the green room. The wall section with the hole has since been removed and is preserved and on display at Cain’s.

References

External links
 Official site
 Cain's Dancing Academy

Buildings and structures in Tulsa, Oklahoma
Event venues on the National Register of Historic Places in Oklahoma
Music venues in Oklahoma
National Register of Historic Places in Tulsa, Oklahoma
Theatres on the National Register of Historic Places in Oklahoma
Tourist attractions in Tulsa, Oklahoma
Culture of Tulsa, Oklahoma
Economy of Tulsa, Oklahoma
Western swing